Rose Collins is a camogie player, winner of an All-Star award in 2007 and a Lynchpin award, predecessor of the All Stars, in 2003. In addition to her All Star awards in 2007 and a 2003, she was nominated for the All-Star shortlist in 2004.

References

Living people
Year of birth missing (living people)
Limerick camogie players